Dame Rosemary Jane Spencer,  (born 1 April 1941) is a retired British civil servant and diplomat. From 1996 to 2001, she served as the United Kingdom's Ambassador to the Netherlands.

References

1941 births
Living people
Dames Commander of the Order of St Michael and St George
Ambassadors of the United Kingdom to the Netherlands
Civil servants in the Foreign Office
Members of HM Diplomatic Service
British women ambassadors
20th-century British diplomats
21st-century British diplomats